Durham most commonly refers to:
Durham, England, a cathedral city and the county town of County Durham
County Durham, an English county
Durham County, North Carolina, a county in North Carolina, United States
Durham, North Carolina, a city in North Carolina, United States
Durham may also refer to:

Places

Australia
Durham, Queensland, an outback locality in the Bulloo Shire of Queensland
Durham Ox, Victoria
Durham Lead, Victoria, a locality in the City of Ballarat

Canada
Durham, Nova Scotia
Durham, Ontario, a small town in Grey County, Ontario
Durham County, Ontario, a historic county
Regional Municipality of Durham, a regional government in the Greater Toronto Area of Ontario
Durham (electoral district), a federal electoral district in Durham Region
Durham (provincial electoral district), a provincial electoral district in Durham Region
Durham Bridge, New Brunswick
Durham Parish, New Brunswick
Durham-Sud, Quebec (also known as South Durham)

United Kingdom
County Durham (district), local government unitary authority, from 2009-present
County Palatine of Durham, a historic ecclesiastical county
Durham and Framwelgate, a former local government borough that held city status until 1974
Durham District, a former local government district, which held city status 1974–2009

Kirkpatrick Durham, a village and parish in Dumfries and Galloway, Scotland

United States
Durham, Arkansas
Durham, California
Durham, Colorado, a place in Mesa County
Durham, Connecticut, a New England town
Durham (CDP), Connecticut, the central village in the town
Durham, Florida, a place in Calhoun County
Durham, Georgia
Durham Township, Hancock County, Illinois
Durham, Gibson County, Indiana, a place in Union Township
Durham, La Porte County, Indiana, a place in New Durham Township
Durham, Kansas
Durham, Maine
Durham, Missouri
Durham, New Hampshire, a New England town
Durham (CDP), New Hampshire, the main community in the town
Durham, New York
Durham, Oklahoma
Durham, Oregon
Durham, Pennsylvania

Electoral districts
 Durham (electoral district), House of Commons of Canada (since 1903)
 Durham (provincial electoral district), Legislative Assembly of Ontario, Canada (since 1926)
 Durham (Province of Canada electoral district) (1841–1867)
 Electoral district of Durham, New South Wales Legislative Assembly, Australia (1856–1920)
 Electoral district of County of Durham, New South Wales Legislative Council, Australia (1843–1856)
 City of Durham (UK Parliament constituency) (since 1678)
 County Durham (UK Parliament constituency) (1675–1832)

Ships
 Durham (1814 ship), a ship launched in France
 USS Durham (LKA-114), a Charleston-class amphibious cargo ship of the United States Navy

Other uses 
 Durham (poem), an Old English poem 
 Durham (surname)
 Bishop of Durham, an Anglican bishop office
 Earl of Durham, a British title from 1833 to present
 Durham Cathedral
 Durham County Cricket Club
 Durham Fair, an agricultural fair in Connecticut
 Durham Museum a museum in Omaha, Nebraska
 Durham rule, a way that has been used to frame the insanity defense in the US
 Durham University, a university in Durham, England
 Fort Durham, an archaeological site near Taku Harbor, Alaska

People with the given name
 Durham Glaster, a character in Black Cat
 Durham, a male hyena in Beastars

See also 
 Durham Academy (disambiguation)
 Durham City (disambiguation)
 Durham County (disambiguation)
 Durham station (disambiguation)
 Durham Report on Canada, 1839
 Durham Township (disambiguation)
 Durhamville (disambiguation)
 Durum, a breed of wheat
 Justice Durham (disambiguation)
 New Durham (disambiguation)